Oracle Corporation's Oracle Ultra Search (also known as Ultrasearch) allows the generation of indexes to textual material stored (for example) on web-servers, file-servers, databases and mail-systems.  It uses crawlers and Oracle Text utilities to build its indexes, which it then makes available within an Oracle database.

Oracle Corporation makes Ultrasearch available free-of-charge to customers who purchase an Oracle database, an Oracle Application Server or the Oracle Collaboration Suite.

By default, Oracle Ultra Search uses the WKSYS schema and the DRSYS tablespace.

History
Oracle Search originated with Oracle 9i.

External links
 Oracle's documentation for Ultra Search

Footnotes 

Oracle software